Jetětice is a municipality and village in Písek District in the South Bohemian Region of the Czech Republic. It has about 300 inhabitants.

Administrative parts
The village of Červená is an administrative part of Jetětice.

References

Villages in Písek District